Lum Afrim Rexhepi (born 3 August 1992) is a professional footballer who most recently played as a defender for Albanian club Partizani Tirana and the Kosovo national team.

Born in Finland of Kosovan descent, he represented his place of birth at international level, until switching to his parent of birth, Kosovo, in 2014.

Club career

Lillestrøm
On 27 January 2015, Rexhepi joined Tippeligaen side Lillestrøm, on a one-year contract, but ended up spending almost the whole season injured and his contract was not renewed after the season.

Return to HJK Helsinki
On 15 January 2016, Rexhepi returned to Veikkausliiga side HJK Helsinki, on a one-year contract. On 31 January 2016, he made his debut with HJK Helsinki in a Finnish League Cup match against IFK Mariehamn after being named in the starting line-up.

Go Ahead Eagles
On 9 February 2017, Rexhepi joined Eredivisie side Go Ahead Eagles, on a one and a half-year contract. On 2 April 2017, he made his debut in a 1–2 away win against Twente after coming on as a substitute at 86th minute in place of Sam Hendriks.

KuPS
On 29 March 2018, Rexhepi joined Veikkausliiga side KuPS, on a five-month contract. On 18 April 2018, he made his debut in a 1–0 away defeat against RoPS after being named in the starting line-up.

Partizani Tirana
On 14 January 2019, Rexhepi joined Albanian Superliga side Partizani Tirana for the remaining part of 2018–19 season with the right of renewal for another year. On 22 January 2019, he made his debut with Partizani Tirana in the second round of 2018–19 Albanian Cup against Kastrioti after being named in the starting line-up. He made his first Albanian Superliga appearance on 25 January after being named in the starting line-up in a 0–1 minimal away win against Skënderbeu Korçë.

JäPS
In February 2020, Rexhepi joined Finnish club JäPS. He left the club again at the end of the year.

International career

Finland

Youth
From 2008, until 2014, Rexhepi has been part of Finland at youth international level, respectively has been part of the U16, U18, U19, U20 and U21 teams and he with these teams played 22 matches and scored 2 goals.

Senior
On 14 January 2013, Rexhepi was named as part of the Finland's 22-man squad for the 2013 King's Cup in Thailand. His debut with Finland came on 26 January in the 2013 King's Cup final against Sweden after coming on as a substitute at 77th minute in place of Markus Halsti.

Kosovo
On 2 March 2014, Rexhepi received a call-up from Kosovo for the first permitted by FIFA match against Haiti and made his debut after coming on as a substitute at 65th minute in place of Loret Sadiku.

Career statistics

Club

International

References

External links

Profile - Voetbal International

1992 births
Living people
Finnish people of Kosovan descent
Finnish people of Albanian descent
Kosovo Albanians
Footballers from Turku
Kosovan footballers
Finnish footballers
Association football defenders
FC Viikingit players
Helsingin Jalkapalloklubi players
Klubi 04 players
FC Honka players
Pallohonka players
Lillestrøm SK players
Go Ahead Eagles players
Kuopion Palloseura players
FK Partizani Tirana players
Veikkausliiga players
Kakkonen players
Eliteserien players
Eredivisie players
Kategoria Superiore players
Finland youth international footballers
Finland under-21 international footballers
Finland international footballers
Kosovo international footballers
Dual internationalists (football)
Finnish expatriate footballers
Finnish expatriate sportspeople in Norway
Finnish expatriate sportspeople in the Netherlands
Finnish expatriate sportspeople in Albania
Kosovan expatriate footballers
Kosovan expatriate sportspeople in Norway
Kosovan expatriate sportspeople in the Netherlands
Kosovan expatriate sportspeople in Albania
Expatriate footballers in Norway
Expatriate footballers in the Netherlands
Expatriate footballers in Albania
Järvenpään Palloseura players